Yang Kuiyi (1885 – 1946) was a Chinese general of the Second Sino-Japanese War who became a high-ranking military official of the Nanjing Nationalist Government, a regime established by Imperial Japan.

Biography 
Yang Kuiyi was born in the Hubei Province during the reign of the Guangxu Emperor and joined the local New Army in 1903. In 1912, he studied at the infantry department of the Imperial Japanese Army Academy. Upon his return to Republic of China he held various administrative positions in his native Hubei Province since the early 1930s and also rose through the ranks of the National Revolutionary Army. In 1939, he defected to the side of Wang Jingwei and joined his new pro-Japanese regime, proclaimed in Nanjing. When the Reorganized National Government was formally inaugurated in 1940, he was made Chief of General Staff and a member of several government committees. In 1942, he was made governor of the Hubei province, with the provincial government being reorganized in 1943. In 1945, Yang was appointed to head the National Military Council, a post that he held for the rest of the war. He was executed in 1946.

Sources

References

Literature 
Xu, Youchun. Dictionary of the People of the Republic (民国人物大辞典 増訂版). Hebei People's Publishing House, 2007. .
Liu, Shou. Official Chronology of the Republic of China (民国職官年表). Zhonghua Book Company, 1995. .

1885 births
1946 deaths
Kuomintang collaborators with Imperial Japan
Executed Chinese collaborators with Imperial Japan
National Revolutionary Army generals from Hubei
Qing dynasty military personnel